The following is a list of Cal State Bakersfield Roadrunners men's basketball head coaches. There have been eight head coaches of the Roadrunners in their 52-season history.

Cal State Bakersfield's current head coach is Rod Barnes. He was hired in March 2011 to replace Keith Brown, whose contract was not renewed following the 2010–11 season.

References

Cal State Bakersfield

Cal State Bakersfield Roadrunners men's basketball coaches